20 SATA Regiment, nicknamed the ‘Alma Mater of Locators’ is a Surveillance and Target Acquisition (SATA) artillery regiment which is part of the Regiment of Artillery of the Indian Army.

Formation 

The Regiment was raised on August 4, 1924 at the School of Artillery in Kakul (now in Pakistan) as 1 Survey Section Royal Indian Artillery under Captain E. R. Culverwell. Upon establishment, it consisted  of only nine personnel, which included two British officers, as well as several V.C.Os, Indian Officers and Other Ranks.  These nine persons, later to be known as the ‘Nine Originals’, had passed a Royal Engineers survey course at Roorkee. They were selected from Mountain Artillery, Cavalry and Infantry Units to form the nucleus of Survey Section Royal Indian Artillery.

History 
Captain Culverwell commanded the section for several years and was followed by Captains H. D. W. Sitwell, C. L. Ferard, K. F. Mackay Lewis, W. J. Gyde and R. MacCaig. 1 Survey Section was reorganised in 1941 as the ‘Survey Troop’ and carried out the survey of the Khyber Pass. In January 1942, it was re-designated as 1 Survey Battery under Major J. H. C. Hunter, and shortly afterwards re-joined the School of Artillery at Deolali.

In August, 1942, the 1st Battery and a new Regimental Headquarters (R.H.Q.) were combined to form the 1st Indian Survey Regiment. The first Commanding Officer was Lieutenant-Colonel J. F. S. Rendall, with Major J. H. C. Hunter as Second-in -Command and Captain Matthews as Adjutant. Major S. A.  Brighty commanded No. 1 Battery. In June, 1943, No. 2 Battery was formed under Major F. A. von  Goldstein.  A radar troop was raised in 1943 as part of the Regiment.

In July 1944, the Regiment moved by road to Ranchi and in August to the Imphal area to join the Burma campaign of World War II. It came under command of 33 Corps, which had begun the pursuit to the Chindwin River line in Burma. No. 2 Survey Battery under Major von Goldstein joined the 11th (East Africa) Division, which was pressing down the Kabaw Valley. The No. 1 Survey Battery under Major B. C. Slater joined the 2 British Division and moved south to take part in the corps artillery concentration covering the crossing of the Irrawaddy River. After the crossings the survey battery joined 20 Division. No. 2 Survey Battery joined 19 Indian Division for the northern crossings of the Irrawaddy. One Military Cross and three Military Medals were awarded to personnel from the regiment.

Orders had been issued that units not urgently required were to return to India and on 13 May 1945, the 1st Indian Survey Regiment was flown to Comilla. Lieutenant-Colonel H. G. Croly was now in command and repatriation had begun, and many changes of all ranks were taking place. The regiment eventually moved to Hyderabad (Sind) under Lieutenant-Colonel von Goldstein as commanding officer. On 25 January 1947,  as a result of the Partition, the 1st Indian Survey Regiment became 20th Survey Regiment, R.I. A., under command of Lieutenant-Colonel Rajbahadur, having shed 2nd Survey Battery. This became the 2nd Survey Battery, R.P.A. (later 13th Survey Battery, R.P.A.).

In 1948, the Regiment took part in the Hyderabad Police Action and Indo-Pakistani War of 1947–1948.

In July 1952, the Regiment was reorganised as the 20 Locating Regiment.  In 1962, it took part in the Indo-China war and saw action in Sikkim and NEFA.

The Regiment fought in the Indo-Pakistani War of 1965 in the Western Sector.

It was part of the 15th Infantry Division in the Indo-Pakistani War of 1971, again in the Western Sector. It was part of the force tasked to defend the Amritsar and Dera Baba Nanak sectors. Commenting on the artillery support, Maj Gen Sukhwant Singh (Deputy Director Military Operations, Army Headquarters), writes in his book ‘India's Wars Since Independence: Defence of the western border’, “The Independent Artillery Brigade supported the operation with intimate, timely and abundant artillery fire. So effective was the brigade’s counter-battery programme that there was no interference by the enemy artillery, “The performance of the Flash Spotting Troop of 20 Locating Regiment in particular, had been commendable. It had started “fixing’ the Pakistani gun areas from Day One, when Pakistan attacked Kasowal. Thereafter, whenever and from wherever the enemy artillery opened up, the eyes and instruments of the flash spotters kept updating its latest locations, enabling effective counter bombardment. The four personnel from the regiment were Mentioned in Despatches.
 
In June 1987, the Regiment was redesignated as the 20 Surveillance and Target Acquisition (SATA) Regiment with the role of carrying out all weather surveillance of targets including enemy guns and mortars. The Regiment has also participated in operations Blue Star in Punjab in 1984, Rakshak, Vijay and Operation Parakram (all in J&K). The regiment had the honour to participate in the Republic Day Parade in 1993. It was awarded the Chief of Amry Staff (COAS) Unit Citation during the Army Day Parade in 2021.

See also
List of artillery regiments of Indian Army

References

Further reading
 Larkhill's Wartime Locators: Royal Artillery Survey in the Second World War by Massimo Mangilli-Climpson. Published by Pen & Sword, 2007. .

External links
 Obituary – Col E. R. Culverwell, pages 103-5 – The Alpine Journal, Vol 63, 1958
 Major-General Hervey Degge Wilmot Sitwell at Forgotten Campaign: The Dutch East Indies Campaign 1941-1942

Military units and formations established in 1942
Artillery regiments of the Indian Army after 1947